Reay is a Scottish village.

Reay may also refer to:

People 
 Alan Reay (1925–2012), English army officer
 Archie Reay (1901–1962), English footballer
 Barry Reay (born 1950), New Zealand historian
 Beccy Gordon Hunter-Reay (born 1978), American off-road racer, pit-reporter, and model
 Bella Reay (1900–1979), English football player
 Billy Reay (1918–2004), Canadian ice hockey player and coach
 Cairine Reay Wilson (1885–1962), Canadian politician
 David Reay, British climate change scientist
 David Reay (pilot) (born 1946), American pilot of Ryan International Airlines Flight 590
 David Reay Palmer (born 1941), American science fiction author
 Diane Reay, English sociologist and academic
 George Reay (1900–1970), English footballer
 George Adam Reay (1901–1971), Scottish biochemist and fish technologist
 George Agnew Reay (1798–1879), English organist and organ builder
 Gilly Reay (1887–1967), English cricketer
 Gord Reay (1943–2000), Canadian army officer
 Harold Reay (1896–1959), English footballer
 Ian Reay Mackay (1922–2020), Australian immunologist
 James Reay Fraser (1908–1970), Australian politician
 Joseph Reay Greene (1836–1903), Irish zoologist
 Marie Reay (1922–2004), Australian anthropologist
 Mark Reay, American fashion photographer
 Melanie Reay (born c. 1981), English football manager
 Phil Reay-Smith, British communications director
 Reay Tannahill (1929–2007), British historian and author
 Ryan Hunter-Reay (born 1980), American racing driver
 Samuel Reay (1828–1905), English organist and composer
 Shaun Reay (born 1989), English footballer
 Stephen Reay (1782–1861), Scottish academic and clergyman
 Ted Reay (1914–1992), English footballer
 Thomas Reay (1834–1914), English cricketer and clergyman
 Wilfrid Reay (1891−1915), English cricketer and army officer
 William Thomas Reay (1858–1929), Australian journalist and politician

Places 
 Khtum Reay Lech, a Cambodian village
 Reay Boathouse, Three Lakes, Wisconsin, United States
 Reay Country, another name for Strathnaver, a valley in Scotland
 Reay E. Sterling Middle School, Quincy, Massachusetts, United States
 Reay Parish Church, Caithness, Scotland
 Reay Road railway station, Mumbai, India

Other 
 Lord Reay, a Scottish title
 Reay Fencibles, a Scottish military corps